The men's triple jump event at the 2016 IAAF World U20 Championships was held at Zdzisław Krzyszkowiak Stadium on 20 and 21 July.

Medalists

Records

Results

Qualification
Qualification: 16.10 (Q) or at least 12 best performers (q) qualified for the final.

Final

References

Triple jump
Triple jump at the World Athletics U20 Championships